Marie-Josée Arès-Pilon (born 30 April 1982) is a weightlifter competing for Canada. She won a bronze medal in the women's 69 kg competition with a total lift of 214 kg at the 2014 Commonwealth Games in Glasgow.

References

1982 births
Living people
Canadian female weightlifters
Weightlifters at the 2014 Commonwealth Games
Commonwealth Games bronze medallists for Canada
Commonwealth Games medallists in weightlifting
20th-century Canadian women
21st-century Canadian women
Medallists at the 2014 Commonwealth Games